Starye Chechkaby (İske Çäçqab: "Old Chechkab" or Урман Чәчкабы, Urman Çäçqabı) is a village in the Kaybitsky District of the Republic of Tatarstan. It is near the river Berlya, which flows into Sviyaga.

Climate
The climate is moderately continental, with a Köppen climate classification of Dfb (humid continental climate).

History
The village dates back to ancient times. The first records date from the years 1565–1567. The village has been known since the time of the Khanate of Kazan. This can be seen in archival documents and local history materials collected by K. Galimov and Kalimullin.

According to legend, at the time of the capture of Kazan two Beks (aristocrats) named Chechka-bek and Kulay-bek lived in the village. Kulay-bek helped besiege the city during the capture of Kazan. The king gave him land to the south of the village, where the Buinsky District (New Chechkaby) is now located. Chechka-bek helped the defenders, and perished in the defense of Kazan. Because of this, his village was destroyed, and the remaining villagers founded a new village, which was named in his honor (Chechkaby).

Through the territory of the village is a bypass of Kazan, which was built during the Great Patriotic War. During that war, 165 people left the village, and of these, 111 were lost in battles for the Motherland.

Population
Mostly Tatars live in the village. Mordvinians (Agish side) and Chuvashes also lived in the village, but later gradually moved out or became Tatars under the influence of Islam.

I.A. Iznoskov in his "Materials of the Inhabitants of the Villages and the County Sviazhsky 1880 – 90 years" wrote that 557 people lived in the village of Old Chechkabs (268 men and 289 women). In 1877, 206 men and 198 women lived in 87 houses. The population later decreased as people fled south in search of land.

Mosque
The mosque and mahallah were founded 1790. This mosque was in a ravine, because it was not permitted to build mosques in the uplands. It was reconstructed in 1871 using donations from village inhabitants. In 1937 the tower of the mosque was demolished by the Bolsheviks and the building was turned into a house of culture. A new mosque, which is still extant, was built in 1833, but is no longer in use. The current mosque opened on July 16, 1995, at the new location.

Mullahs
 Damela Mohammed
 Abdellatif Alka son of Abdelsha Bikchur
 Zalyaletdin Nazir
 Ahmadzakir Mella Zalyaletdin
 Sitdikov Gabdeshakur
 Yarhamutdin Saifutdinov, son of Zalyaletdin
 Zinnatulla Zagidullin
 Firdus Shagiev

Muazzins
 Abdelzhabbar Ait
 Kamarutdin Abdelgaffar
 Sitdikov Gabidulla
 Yarhamutdin Sayfetdin
 Nurutdin Khairutdinov
 Davlyatsha Gallyamov

Gallery

References

Rural localities in Kaybitsky District
Sviyazhsky Uyezd